TRUSTID is a Portland, Oregon-based telephone authentication technology company led by CEO Patrick Cox. TRUSTID pioneered solutions that prevent Identity Interrogation technology. It was acquired by Neustar in 2014.

References

Companies based in Portland, Oregon
Software companies based in Oregon
Defunct software companies of the United States